Dohad may refer to:
 Dahod, a town-city in India
 Developmental Origins of Health and Disease in the context of thrifty phenotype